Stephen Leslie Simmonds is an Australian Paralympic swimmer and disabled waterskiing world champion.  In February 1982, at the age of six, his right leg was amputated below the knee after a car knocked him off his bike.  After the accident, he took up BMX riding, football, basketball, gymnastics and competitive swimming.  He attended St Edmund's College, Canberra. At the age of twelve, he was the first student with a disability to compete at the Australian Primary Schools Championships.  At the 1989 FESPIC Games in Kobe, Japan, he won a gold medal, two silver medals and a bronze medal in swimming events.  He did not win a medal at the 1990 World Championships and Games for the Disabled in Assen, Netherlands.

He won a bronze medal at the 1992 Barcelona Games in the Men's 200 m Medley SM10 event; He also competed in the Men’s 50 m Freestyle,  Men’s 100 m Freestyle, Men’s 100 m Butterfly S10,  Men's 4x100 m, Freestyle S7–10 and  Men's 4x100 m Medley S7–10 events.

At the age of eleven, he started water skiing.  At the 1993 World Disabled Water Skiing Championships in France he won four gold medals and broke three world records and named Overall Men’s World Champion. He was the first disabled person to perform a flip. He continues to water ski at a competitive level.. He won 25 medals at the Paralympics

He had an Australian Institute of Sport Athletes with a Disability scholarship from 1993 to 1995 and in 1997. In 2000, he received an Australian Sports Medal for his skiing achievements.

He is married to Fiona, and has two daughters Ruby and Tayla.  His  daughters both water ski with Tayla Simmonds in 2011 being the youngest ever skier to contest the Moomba Championships at Melbourne.  He has walked the Kokoda Track.   He works as an electrical contractor.

References

Male Paralympic swimmers of Australia
Swimmers at the 1992 Summer Paralympics
Paralympic bronze medalists for Australia
Australian water skiers
Australian Institute of Sport Paralympic swimmers
Recipients of the Australian Sports Medal
Year of birth missing (living people)
Living people
Medalists at the 1992 Summer Paralympics
Paralympic medalists in swimming
FESPIC Games competitors
Australian male medley swimmers
Australian male freestyle swimmers
Australian male butterfly swimmers
S10-classified Paralympic swimmers